The men's 5000 metres relay at the 2011 Asian Winter Games was held on February 1 and 2, 2011 in Astana, Kazakhstan.

Schedule
All times are Almaty Time (UTC+06:00)

Results
Legend
PEN — Penalty

Heats

Heat 1

Heat 2

Final

References

Final

External links
Official website

Men Relay